Hama Castle is a mostly-ruined fortress located in Hama, Syria, Located on the Orontes River.

History
The location is dated back to the Seleucids. Later on, it was taken by the Romans, until it was captured by Abu Ubaidah ibn al-Jarrah. It was later controlled by the Qarmatians, Mirdasids and the Seljuks.

It was devastated during the 1157 Hama earthquake. Afterwards, it was rebuilt by the Zengids and Ayyubids, before it was destroyed by the Mongols in 1258. Sultan Baibars rebuilt it again, and by the Ottoman era, it lost its strategic value and barely anything of it left. 

It was excavated by a Danish expedition between 1931 and 1938.

See also
List of castles in Syria

References

Castles in Syria
History of Hama Governorate
Buildings and structures in Hama Governorate